Zamość is a village in the administrative district of Gmina Karsin, within Kościerzyna County, Pomeranian Voivodeship, in northern Poland.

For details of the history of the region, see History of Pomerania.

The village has a population of 131.

References

Villages in Kościerzyna County